Chilcayoc Grande (possibly from Quechua ch'illka baccharis, -yuq a suffix to indicate possession, "the one that has got baccharis" or "the one with baccharis", Spanish grande large) is a volcano in the Andes of Peru, about  high. It is situated in the "Valley of the Volcanoes" in the Arequipa Region, Castilla Province, Andagua District. Chilcayoc Grande lies south-west of the Chachas Lake and south-east of the volcanoes Chilcayoc and Jechapita (3,388 m).

References

Volcanoes of Peru
Mountains of Arequipa Region
Mountains of Peru
Landforms of Arequipa Region